Acacia harpophylla, commonly known as brigalow, brigalow spearwood or orkor, is an endemic tree of Australia. The Aboriginal Australian group the Gamilaraay peoples know the tree as Barranbaa or Burrii. It is found in central and coastal Queensland to northern New South Wales.

Description
The tree is root-suckering and has hard, furrowed and almost black coloured bark. The glabrous or hairy branchlets are angular at extremities. Like most species of Acacia it has phyllodes rather than true leaves. When it blooms, between July and October, it produces condensed inflorescences in groups of two to eight on racemes, usually appearing as axillary clusters. After flowering crustaceous and glabrous seed pods form that are subterete and straight to slightly curved.

Distribution and habitat
Two species, brigalow  (A.  harpophylla) and gidgee (A. cambagei) form open woodlands on flat and gently undulating terrain on heavy and relatively fertile clay and clay-loam soils primarily in the 300-700mm annual rainfall region of Eastern Australia.  These woodlands extend from a northern extreme of 20° S  into northern New South Wales.  Brigalow and gidgee occur as mixed communities in some regions and are commonly associated with several other woody species, including overstorey species such as Eucalyptus coolabah, E. cambageana, Casuarina cristata, and a range of understorey species. A. tephrina, A. georginae and A. argyrodendron also occupy similar habitats and have similar habits and growth forms, but are less widespread, while a number of other Acacia species also form structurally similar communities.

In the north-western regions black gidgee (A.  argyrodendron) replaces brigalow in many areas, while in Central-Western districts Boree (A.  tephrina) forms woodlands and shrublands, frequently on cracking clay soils and often in association with A.  cambagei. Georgina gidgee (A.  georginae) woodlands are found in more arid regions in the  rainfall belt.

In New South Wales it is found from around Roto in the south, to around Hungerford in the west and Willow Tree in the east along the Great Dividing Range. In Queensland it is found as far north as Townsville.

Taxonomy
The species was first formally described by the botanist George Bentham in 1864 as part of the work Flora Australiensis. It was reclassified as Racosperma harpophyllum by Leslie Pedley and transferred back the genus Acacia in 2001. The type specimen was collected from around Rockhampton.
The specific epithet is in reference to the falcate shape of the phyllodes on the tree.

Response to fire
Species associated with these brigalow communities generally have a good capacity for re-sprouting following fire, and brigalow itself sprouts freely from the butt, roots and living stems in response to fire damage.  Both gidgee and blackwood, in contrast, have a limited capacity to resprout following fire damage.  A notable exception to the fire tolerance of brigalow communities occurs in what are referred to as softwood scrubs, which are dense communities of brigalow and a range of particularly fire-sensitive species. Fire in any brigalow or gidgee woodland would be a rare event under natural circumstances, since pasture is at best sparse in these communities, consisting of Chloris, Paspalidium, Dicanthium, Sporobolus and Eragrostis species.

See also
 
 
 List of Acacia species

References

harpophylla
Flora of Queensland
Flora of New South Wales
Fabales of Australia
Drought-tolerant trees
Trees of Australia
Bushfood
Plants described in 1864
Taxa named by Ferdinand von Mueller